Indre is a department in the Centre region of France.

Indre may also refer to:

 Indre, Loire-Atlantique, a commune in the Loire-Atlantique region of France
 Indre (river), in central France
 Indrė, a Lithuanian feminine given name